Stephen Harding ( 106028 March 1134) was an English-born monk and abbot, who was one of the founders of the Cistercian Order. He is honoured as a saint in the Roman Catholic Church.

Life
There is little archival evidence, yet all sources agree that Stephen was English and spent some time at the monastery of Sherborne as a young man. The main source about his youth, William of Malmesbury, states that Stephen then went to France and became friends with another Englishman, called Peter. The two made a pilgrimage to Rome, took new religious names and then went to Molesme Abbey upon returning to Burgundy, around 1085. On their return from Rome, they also experienced the monastic traditions of the Camaldolese and Vallombrosians.

In 1098, Stephen went to the new monastery (soon to be known as Cîteaux) together with Robert and Alberic, was elected abbot in 1108, and died in 1134.

Stephen was the third abbot of Cîteaux. Under his administration, very few novices were joining the community and the monks were suffering from hunger and sickness. In 1112, Bernard of Clairvaux entered the community, bringing with him thirty companions.

Between 1112 and 1119, a dozen new Cistercian houses were founded to accommodate those joining the young order. Harding's organizational skills were exceptional; he instituted the system of general chapters and regular visitations. In 1119, he received official approbation for the Carta Caritatis (Charter of Charity), an important document for the Cistercian Order, establishing its unifying principles. Many of his policies and decisions were influenced from his time with the Vallombrosians.

Stephen Harding served as abbot of Cîteaux for twenty-five years. While no single person is considered the founder of the Cistercian Order, the shape of Cistercian thought and its rapid growth in the 12th century were certainly due in some part to Harding's leadership. He was the abbot who accepted Bernard of Clairvaux. Insisting on simplicity in all aspects of monastic life, Stephen encouraged the severity of Cistercian architecture and the simple beauty of the Order's liturgy and music. He was an accomplished scribe; his highest achievement is considered to be the Harding Bible. In 1133, he resigned as abbot because of poor eyesight. He died on 28 March 1134.

Veneration for Stephen began in the modern era. His feast was celebrated on 28 March until 1683 and then moved to 17 April, where it remained until the liturgical reforms following the Second Vatican Council, when it was moved back to 28 March. In a joint commemoration with Robert of Molesme and Alberic, the first two abbots of Cîteaux, the Cistercians and Benedictines today celebrate Stephen Harding's feast day on 26 January.

References

Bibliography

 Claudio Stercal, Stephen Harding: A Biographical Sketch and Texts (Trappist, Kentucky: Cistercian Publications, 2008) (Cistercian Studies Series, 226).

1050s births
1134 deaths
People from Sherborne
English Cistercians
Founders of Catholic religious communities
11th-century Christian saints
12th-century Christian saints
Medieval English saints
Medieval European scribes
English Roman Catholic saints
Year of birth unknown
Cistercian abbots general
Cistercian saints
Canonizations by Pope Urban VIII